The Battle of Chusto-Talasah, also known as Bird Creek, Caving Banks, and High Shoal, was fought December 9, 1861, in what is now Tulsa County, Oklahoma (then Indian Territory) during the American Civil War. It was the second of three battles in the Trail of Blood on Ice campaign for the control of Indian Territory during the American Civil War.

A series of battles were fought in December in bad weather between the Confederate Cherokee and Choctaw Indians and the Union Creek and Seminole Indians (led by the Muscogee Creek chief Opothleyahola) who supported the Federal government. Following Opothleyahola and his Union force’s defeat at Round Mountain, he retreated northeastward in search of safety. On December 9, 1861, the force was at Chusto-Talasah (Caving Banks) on the Horseshoe Bend of Bird Creek when Col. Douglas H. Cooper’s 1,300 Confederates attacked about 2:00 p.m. Chief Opothleyahola knew Cooper was coming and had placed his troops in a strong position in heavy timber at Horseshoe Bend.

For almost four hours, Cooper attacked and attempted to outflank the Federals, finally driving them across Bird Creek just before dark. Cooper camped there overnight but did not pursue the Federals because he was short of ammunition.  The Confederates claimed victory, although some sources credit Opothleyahola's forces with driving off the attackers.  In any event, Chief Opothleyahola and his band moved on in search of security elsewhere. Their loss was estimated by Cooper as 500 (some accounts suggest 412). Confederate casualties were 15 killed and 37 wounded.

Regardless of whether the Confederates had gained a minor tactical victory here, they would win a resounding one later in the month at Chustenahlah.

The Chusto-Talasah battle site is on privately owned land near 86th Street North and Delaware Avenue, 5 miles northwest of modern Tulsa.  A granite marker on the east side of Sperry, Oklahoma places the battlesite 9 miles N.E.S.E. of that point.

Order of battle
Cooper's Brigade - Col. Douglas H. Cooper
6 companies, 1st Choctaw-Chickasaw Mounted Rifles - Maj. Mitchell Laflore
Detachment, Choctaw Battalion - Capt. Alfred Wade
Detachment, 1st Creek Regiment - Col. Daniel N. McIntosh
Detachment, Creek Indians - Capt. James M. C. Smith
1st Cherokee Mounted Rifle Regiment - Col. John Drew
4th Texas Cavalry Regiment - Col. William B. Sims
Detachment, 9th Texas Cavalry - Lt. Col. William Quayle
Whitfield’s Battalion - Capt. John W. Whitfield

Creek and Seminole Indians - Chief Opothleyahola
Lockapoka Creeks
Muscogee Creeks
Seminoles - Halleck Tustenuggee, Sonuk Mikko

See also

 List of battles fought in Oklahoma
 Trail of Blood on Ice

References

 National Park Service Battle Summary
 U.S. War Department, The War of the Rebellion: A Compilation of the Official Records of the Union and Confederate Armies, 70 volumes in 4 series. Washington, D.C.: United States Government Printing Office, 1880-1901. Series 1, Volume 8, Part 1, pages 8–10.
 White, Christine Schultz and White, Benton R., Now The Wolf Has Come: The Creek Nation in the Civil War, Texas A & M University Press, 1996. .

External links
 Encyclopedia of Oklahoma History and Culture - "Chusto Talasa, Battle of"
 Creek Indians in the American Civil War
 On this date in Civil War history: December 9, 1861 - The Battle of Chusto-Talasah (150th Anniversary)

 Battle of Chusto-Talasah December 9, 1861

Battles of the Trans-Mississippi Theater of the American Civil War
Trail of Blood on Ice
Confederate victories of the American Civil War
Battles of the American Civil War in Indian Territory
Tulsa County, Oklahoma
1861 in Indian Territory
December 1861 events
American Civil War orders of battle